Dybal or Dybał is a surname of Slavic origin, e.g. from Polish dybać, from Proto-Slavic *dybati. Notable people with the surname include:
 Bruno Dybal (born 1994), Brazilian footballer
 Jurek Dybał (born 1977), Polish conductor

See also
 Dąbal
 Dybala
 

Polish-language surnames